Atta laevigata (Smith, 1858) is one of about a dozen species of leafcutter ants in the genus Atta, found from Venezuela and south to Paraguay. This species is one of the largest leafcutter species, and can be recognized by the smooth and shining head of the largest workers in a colony. Atta laevigata is known in northern South America as hormiga culona (literally translated as "big-assed ant"), or as sikisapa in Peru, zompopo de mayo in Central America, bachaco culón in Venezuela, akango in Paraguay, and chicatana in Mexico.

The colony sizes of these ants are made up of around 3.5 million individuals.

Cuisine

The hormiga culona has been eaten for hundreds of years, as a tradition inherited from pre-Colombian cultures as the Guanes. The ants are harvested for about nine weeks every year, at the time of the rainy season, which is when they make the nuptial flight; A. laevigata are used as traditional gifts in weddings. There are local beliefs that the ants are aphrodisiacs.

The harvesting is done by local peasants who are often wounded by the ants, since the ants have strong mandibles. Only the queens are collected, because the other ants are not considered edible. The legs and wings are removed; after that, the ants are soaked in salty water and roasted in ceramic pans. The main centers of production of ants are the municipalities of San Gil and Barichara. From there, the trade of ants is extended to Bucaramanga and Bogotá, where the packages containing ants are often seen during the season. The exportation of this product is mainly made to Canada, England and Japan.

Analyses conducted at the Industrial University of Santander about the nutritional value of the ants show high level of protein, very low levels of saturated fat, and an overall high nutritional value.

Atta laevigata is a temporary source of income for the poor peasants of the area. This and the competition for resources with more aggressive species of leafcutter ants ("arrieras") cause a progressive decrease of the population of ants, as estimated in recent studies in a remaining of only a sixth of the existent population twelve years ago, and for this reason there is concern about its conservation status.

References

External links

Crunchy, Big-Butt Ants Entice Gourmands In Discovery Channel animal news. Retrieved December 26, 2006.

Atta (genus)
Edible insects
Colombian cuisine
Hymenoptera of South America
Insects described in 1858
Taxa named by Frederick Smith (entomologist)